Scott Vlaun is an American photographer and environmentalist and a co-founder of Moose Pond Arts + Ecology and Center for an Ecology-Based Economy in Norway, Maine, where he is the Executive Director. CEBE is a climate justice organization founded in 2013 that is dedicated to developing resilient local food systems, community-based renewable energy, public, electric, and human-powered transport, and affordable, efficient housing. Scott practices and teaches permaculture design both in Maine and at the Maharishi University in Fairfield Iowa, where he is an adjunct faculty member in the Sustainable Living Department. He continues to write and photograph for publication.

His photographs have appeared in Mother Earth News articles and other publications that relate to agriculture, climate change and the planetary ecology. He was born in 1958. In 1984 he got his bachelor's degree from Portland School of Art and in 1997 obtained Master's from the University of New Mexico.

References

Living people
20th-century births
American photographers
University of New Mexico alumni
Year of birth missing (living people)